Bernie Fyffe (22 December 1921 – 9 March 1994) was an Australian rules footballer who played for the Fitzroy Football Club and St Kilda Football Club in the Victorian Football League (VFL).

Notes

External links 
		

1921 births
1994 deaths
Australian rules footballers from Victoria (Australia)
Fitzroy Football Club players
St Kilda Football Club players
Brunswick Football Club players